Münster is an independent city (Kreisfreie Stadt) in North Rhine-Westphalia, Germany. It is in the northern part of the state and is considered to be the cultural centre of the Westphalia region. It is also a state district capital. Münster was the location of the Anabaptist rebellion during the Protestant Reformation and the site of the signing of the Treaty of Westphalia ending the Thirty Years' War in 1648. Today it is known as the bicycle capital of Germany.

Münster gained the status of a Großstadt (major city) with more than 100,000 inhabitants in 1915. , there are 300,000 people living in the city, with about 61,500 students, only some of whom are recorded in the official population statistics as having their primary residence in Münster. Münster is a part of the international Euregio region with more than 1,000,000 inhabitants (Enschede, Hengelo, Gronau, Osnabrück).

History

Early history
In 793, Charlemagne sent out Ludger as a missionary to evangelise the Münsterland. In 797, Ludger founded a school that later became the Cathedral School. Gymnasium Paulinum traces its history back to this school. Ludger was ordained as the first bishop of Münster. The first cathedral was completed by 850. The combination of ford and crossroad, market place, episcopal administrative centre, library and school, established Münster as an important centre. In 1040, Heinrich III became the first king of Germany to visit Münster.

Middle Ages and early modern period
In the Middle Ages, the Prince-Bishopric of Münster was a leading member of the Hanseatic League.

In 1534, an apocalyptic Anabaptist sect, led by John of Leiden, took power in the Münster rebellion and founded a democratic proto-socialistic state. They claimed all property, burned all books except the Bible, and called it the "New Jerusalem". John of Leiden believed he would lead the elect from Münster to capture the entire world and purify it of evil with the sword in preparation for the Second Coming of Christ and the beginning of the Millennium. They went so far as to require all citizens to be naked as preparation for the Second Coming. However, the town was recaptured in 1535; the Anabaptists were tortured to death and their corpses were exhibited in metal baskets, which can still be seen hanging from the tower of St. Lambert's Church.

Part of the signing of the Peace of Westphalia of 1648 was held in Münster. This ended the Thirty Years' War and the Eighty Years' War. It also guaranteed the future of the prince-bishop and the diocese; the area was to be exclusively Roman Catholic.

18th, 19th and early 20th centuries

The last outstanding palace of the German baroque period, the Schloss Münster, was created according to plans by Johann Conrad Schlaun. The University of Münster (today called "Westfälische Wilhelms-Universität Münster", WWU) was established in 1780. It is now a major European centre for excellence in education and research with large faculties in the arts, humanities, theology, sciences, business and law. Currently there are about 40,000 undergraduate and postgraduate students enrolled. In 1802 Münster was conquered by Prussia during the Napoleonic Wars. It was also part of the Grand Duchy of Berg between 1806 and 1811 and the Lippe department of the First French Empire between 1811 and 1813, before returning to Prussian rule. It became the capital of the Prussian province of Westphalia. In 1899 the city's harbour started operations when the city was linked to the Dortmund-Ems Canal.

World War II

In the 1940s the Bishop of Münster, Cardinal Clemens August Graf von Galen, was one of the most prominent critics of the Nazi government. In retaliation for his success (The New York Times described Bishop von Galen as "the most obstinate opponent of the National Socialist anti-Christian program"), Münster was heavily garrisoned during World War II, and five large complexes of barracks are still a feature of the city. Münster was the headquarters (Hauptsitz) for the 6th Military District (Wehrkreis) of the German Wehrmacht, under the command of Infantry General (General der Infanterie) Gerhard Glokke. Originally made up of Westphalia and the Rhineland, after the Battle of France it was expanded to include the Eupen – Malmedy district of Belgium. The headquarters controlled military operations in Münster, Essen, Düsseldorf, Wuppertal, Bielefeld, Coesfeld, Paderborn, Herford, Minden, Detmold, Lingen, Osnabrück, Recklinghausen, Gelsenkirchen, and Cologne.

Münster was the home station for the VI and XXIII Infantry Corps (Armeekorps), as well as the XXXIII and LVI Panzerkorps. Münster was also the home of the 6th, 16th and 25th Panzer Division; the 16th Panzergrenadier Division; and the 6th, 26th, 69th, 86th, 106th, 126th, 196th, 199th, 211th, 227th, 253rd, 254th, 264th, 306th, 326th, 329th, 336th, 371st, 385th, and 716th Infantry Divisions (Infanterie-division).

A secondary target of the Oil Campaign of World War II, Münster was bombed on 25 October 1944 by 34 diverted B-24 Liberator bombers, during a mission to a nearby primary target, the Scholven/Buer synthetic oil plant at Gelsenkirchen. About 91% of the Old City and 63% of the entire city was destroyed by Allied air raids. The US 17th Airborne Division, employed in a standard infantry role and not in a parachute capacity, attacked Münster with the British 6th Guards Tank Brigade on 2 April 1945 in a ground assault and fought its way into the contested city centre, which was cleared in urban combat on the following day.

Postwar period
From 1946 to 1998, there was a Latvian secondary school in Münster, and in 1947, one of the largest of about 93 Latvian libraries in the West was established in Münster.

In the 1950s the Old City was rebuilt to match its pre-war state, though many of the surrounding buildings were replaced with cheaper modern structures. It was also for several decades a garrison town for the British forces stationed in West Germany.

Post-reunification
In 2004, Münster won an honourable distinction: the LivCom-Award for the most livable city in the world with a population between 200,000 and 750,000. Münster is famous and liked for its bicycle friendliness and for the student character of the city that is due to the influence of its university, the Westfälische Wilhelms Universität Münster.

Geography

Geographic position

The Wolstonian sediments of the mountain ridge called "Münsterländer Kiessandzug" cross the city from north to south. The highest elevation is the Mühlenberg in the northwest of Münster, 97 metres above sea level. The lowest elevation is at the Ems, 44 m above sea level. The city centre is 60 m above sea level, measured at the Prinzipalmarkt in front of the historic city hall.

Münster is one of the 42 agglomeration areas and one of Germany's biggest cities in terms of area. But it includes substantial sparsely-populated rural districts which were formerly separate local government authorities until they were amalgamated in 1975. Thus nearly half the city's area is agricultural, resulting in a low population-density of approximately 900 inhabitants per km2.

Population density
The city's built-up area is quite extensive. There are no skyscrapers and few high-rise buildings but very many detached houses and mansions. Still the population density reaches about 15,000 inhabitants per km2 in the city centre. Calculating the population density based on the actual populated area results in approximately 2890 inhabitants per km2.

Climate
A well-known saying in Münster is "Entweder es regnet oder es läuten die Glocken. Und wenn beides zusammen fällt, dann ist Sonntag" ("Either it rains or the church bells ring. The perception of Münster as a rain-laden city isn't caused by the absolute amount of rainfall but by the above-average number of rainy days with relatively small amounts of rainfall. Consequently, Münster is in the bottom fifth in comparison with other German cities. The winter in Münster is fairly mild and snowfall is unusual. The temperature during summertime meets the average in Germany. The highest daily rainfall was registered on 28 July 2014: One weather station of the MeteoGroup reported a rainfall of  the State Environment Agency registered at one of its stations  during seven hours. The record rainfall led to severe flooding throughout the city and the nearby Greven.

Adjacent cities and districts
Münster borders on the following cities and municipalities, named clockwise and beginning in the northwest: Altenberge and Greven (District of Steinfurt), Telgte, Everswinkel, Sendenhorst and Drensteinfurt (District of Warendorf), as well as Ascheberg, Senden and Havixbeck (District of Coesfeld).

City boroughs

The city is divided into six administrative districts or Stadtbezirke: "Mitte" (Middle), "Nord" (North), "Ost" (East), "West", "Süd-Ost" (South-East) and "Hiltrup". Each district is represented by a council of 19 representatives elected in local elections. Heading each council is the district mayor, or Bezirksvorsteher. Every district is subdivided into residential quarters (Wohnbereiche). This official term, however, is not used in common speech, as there are no discrete definitions of the individual quarters. The term "Stadtteil" is used instead, mainly referring to the incorporated communities. The districts are also divided into 45 statistical districts.

The following list names each district with its residential and additional quarters. These are the official names, which partly differ from the usage in common speech.

Mitte:
Kernbereich (Centre)
Nord:
Münster-Coerde|Coerde
Kinderhaus
Sprakel with Sandrup
Ost:
Dyckburg, consisting of Mariendorf and Sudmühle
Gelmer with Gittrup
Handorf with Kasewinkel, Kreuzbach, Laer, Dorbaum and Verth on the left bank of the Ems and Werse
Mauritz-Ost and Mondstraße, combined better known as St. Mauritz
West:
Albachten
Gievenbeck
Mecklenbeck
Nienberge with Häger, Schönebeck and Uhlenbrock
Roxel with Altenroxel and Oberort
Sentruper Höhe
Süd-Ost:
Angelmodde with Hofkamp
Gremmendorf with Loddenheide
Wolbeck
Hiltrup:
Amelsbüren with Sudhoff, Loevelingloh and Wilbrenning
Berg Fidel
Hiltrup

The centre can be subdivided into historically evolved city districts whose borders are not always strictly defined, such as
Aaseestadt
Erphoviertel
Geistviertel
Hansaviertel
Herz-Jesu-Viertel
Kreuzviertel
Kuhviertel
Mauritzviertel
Neutor
Pluggendorf
Rumphorst
Schlossviertel
Südviertel
Uppenberg
Zentrum Nord

Demographics

Münster has approximately 300,000 inhabitants, and more than 10,000 others who have their secondary residence in the city. The city has about 50,000 resident foreigners. The life-expectancy in Münster is 76.3 years for men and 83.1 years for women. The average age of Münster's residents was 40 in 2006.

Population development since 1816:

Number of largest foreign groups in Münster by nationality:

Politics

Mayor

The current Mayor of Münster is Markus Lewe of the Christian Democratic Union (CDU), who was elected in 2009 and re-elected in 2015 and 2020. The most recent mayoral election was held on 13 September 2020, with a runoff held on 27 September, and the results were as follows:

! rowspan=2 colspan=2| Candidate
! rowspan=2| Party
! colspan=2| First round
! colspan=2| Second round
|-
! Votes
! %
! Votes
! %
|-
| bgcolor=| 
| align=left| Markus Lewe
| align=left| Christian Democratic Union
| 68,817
| 44.6
| 69,705
| 52.6
|-
| bgcolor=| 
| align=left| Peter Todeskino
| align=left| Alliance 90/The Greens
| 43,978
| 28.5
| 62,824
| 47.4
|-
| bgcolor=| 
| align=left| Michael Jung
| align=left| Social Democratic Party
| 25,170
| 16.3
|-
| bgcolor=| 
| align=left| Ulrich Thoden
| align=left| The Left
| 5,200
| 3.4
|-
| bgcolor=| 
| align=left| Jörg Berens
| align=left| Free Democratic Party
| 4,685
| 3.0
|-
| bgcolor=| 
| align=left| Roland Scholle
| align=left| Die PARTEI
| 2,581
| 1.7
|-
| 
| align=left| Georgios Tsakalidis
| align=left| Münster List
| 1,975
| 1.3
|-
| bgcolor=| 
| align=left| Michael Krapp
| align=left| Ecological Democratic Party
| 1,139
| 0.7
|-
| bgcolor=| 
| align=left| Sebastian Kroos
| align=left| Pirate Party Germany
| 918
| 0.6
|-
! colspan=3| Valid votes
! 154,463
! 99.3
! 132,529
! 99.5
|-
! colspan=3| Invalid votes
! 1,132
! 0.7
! 636
! 0.5
|-
! colspan=3| Total
! 155,595
! 100.0
! 133,165
! 100.0
|-
! colspan=3| Electorate/voter turnout
! 247,189
! 62.9
! 247,097
! 53.9
|-
| colspan=7| Source: State Returning Officer
|}

City council

The Münster city council governs the city alongside the Mayor. The most recent city council election was held on 13 September 2020, and the results were as follows:

! colspan=2| Party
! Votes
! %
! +/-
! Seats
! +/-
|-
| bgcolor=| 
| align=left| Christian Democratic Union (CDU)
| 50,465
| 32.7
|  2.5
| 22
|  3
|-
| bgcolor=| 
| align=left| Alliance 90/The Greens (Grüne)
| 46,696
| 30.3
|  10.1
| 20
|  6
|-
| bgcolor=| 
| align=left| Social Democratic Party (SPD)
| 27,163
| 17.6
|  9.4
| 12
|  7
|-
| bgcolor=| 
| align=left| The Left (Die Linke)
| 7,539
| 4.9
|  0.2
| 3
|  1
|-
| bgcolor=| 
| align=left| Free Democratic Party (FDP)
| 7,104
| 4.6
|  1.3
| 3
|  1
|-
| bgcolor=| 
| align=left| Volt Germany (Volt)
| 4,032
| 2.6
| New
| 2
| New
|-
| bgcolor=| 
| align=left| Alternative for Germany (AfD)
| 3,399
| 2.2
|  0.4
| 1
|  1
|-
| bgcolor=| 
| align=left| Die PARTEI (PARTEI)
| 3,196
| 2.1
| New
| 1
| New
|-
| bgcolor=| 
| align=left| Ecological Democratic Party (ÖDP)
| 1,876
| 1.2
|  0.1
| 1
| ±0
|-
| 
| align=left| Munster List (Münsterliste)
| 1,848
| 1.2
| New
| 1
| New
|-
| colspan=7 bgcolor=lightgrey| 
|-
| bgcolor=| 
| align=left| Pirate Party Germany (Piraten)
| 959
| 0.6
|  1.5
| 0
|  2
|-
| 
| align=left| Modern Social Party (MSP)
| 71
| 0.0
| New
| 0
| New
|-
! colspan=2| Valid votes
! 154,348
! 99.2
! 
! 
! 
|-
! colspan=2| Invalid votes
! 1,273
! 0.8
! 
! 
! 
|-
! colspan=2| Total
! 155,621
! 100.0
! 
! 66
!  6
|-
! colspan=2| Electorate/voter turnout
! 247,189
! 63.0
!  3.3
! 
! 
|-
| colspan=7| Source: State Returning Officer
|}

Representation 
Münster forms its own Electoral district (No. 129) for elections on a national level. Due to Germany's mixture of a direct and a proportional electoral system Münster sends a directly elected member into the Bundestag as well as other politicians have the chance to qualify via their party's state-wide list. As for the 2021 German federal election health politician Maria Klein-Schmeink (The Greens) won the districts seat in the Bundestag with 32.3% of the personal vote. Defeated candidates, former member of the Landtag of North Rhine-Westphalia Stefan Nacke (CDU/26.2%) and former environment minister Svenja Schulze (SPD/24.1%) both became members of the 20th Bundestag via their parties' lists. Svenja Schulze enterd the new Scholz cabinet regaining a position as minister, this time in the Federal Ministry for Economic Cooperation and Development.

On the state level Münster was divided into two constituencies up until the 2017 North Rhine-Westphalia state election. The election system of state elections mirrors that of national elections. During the legislative period of Laschet cabinet redistricting resulted in Münster now being split up into three constituencies, two of which now also include some surrounding municipalities. The 2017 election saw both CDU candidates Stefan Nacke and Simone Wendland winning their seat via the constituency. Via party lists Svenja Schulze (SPD) and Josefine Paul (The Greens) entered the Landtag. After Nacke and Schulze both changed into federal politics, Münster is left with only two representatives in the Landtag.

Economy
The city is considered the "creative desk of Westphalia". Greater Münster is home to many industries such as those of public authorities, consulting companies, insurance companies, banks, computer centres, publishing houses, advertising and design. The service sector has created several thousand jobs. Retailers have approximately 1.9 billion euro turnover. The city still has traditional merchants' townhouses as well as modern outlets.

The job market situation in Münster is "comparatively good". Of the approximately 130,000 employees subject to social insurance contribution more than 80% work in the tertiary sector, about 17% work in the secondary sector and 1% work in the primary sector.

Main sights

 St. Paul's Cathedral, built in the 13th century in a mixture of late Romanesque and early Gothic styles. It was completely restored after World War II. It includes an astronomical clock of 1540, adorned with hand-painted zodiac symbols, which traces the movement of the planets, and plays a Glockenspiel tune every noon.
 The Prinzipalmarkt, the main shopping street in the city centre with the Gothic city hall (14th century) in which the Peace of Westphalia treaty which put an end to the Thirty Years' War was signed in 1648. Immediately north of the Prinzipalmarkt is the Roggenmarkt.
 St Lambert's Church (1375), with three cages hanging from its tower above the clock face. In 1535 these cages were used to display the corpses of Jan van Leiden and other leaders of the Münster Rebellion, who promoted polygamy and renunciation of all property.
 Überwasserkirche, a Gothic hall church consecreated in 1340 as church of a Stift which grew to be the University of Münster
 The Schloss (palace), built in 1767–87 as residence for the prince-bishops by the Baroque architect Johann Conrad Schlaun and Wilhelm Ferdinand Lipper. Now the administrative centre for the University.
 The Botanischer Garten Münster, a botanical garden founded in 1803
 The Zwinger fortress built in 1528. Used from the 18th to the 20th century as a prison. During World War II, the Gestapo also used the Zwinger for executions
 "Krameramtshaus" (1589), an old guild house, which housed the delegation from the Netherlands during the signing of the Peace of Westphalia
 Stadthaus (1773)
 Haus Rüschhaus (1743–49), a country estate situated in Nienberge, built by Johann Conrad Schlaun for himself
 Erbdrostenhof (1749–53), a Baroque palace, also built by Schlaun, residence of Droste zu Vischering noble family and birthplace of Blessed Mary of the Divine Heart.
 Clemenskirche (1745–53), a Baroque church, also built by Schlaun
 Kreuzkirche, a Gothic-revival church
 Signal-Iduna Building (1961), the first high-rise building in Münster
 LVM-Building, high-rise building near the Aasee
 LBS-Building, location of Münster's first zoo. Some old structures of the former zoo can be found in the park around the office building. Also the "Tuckesburg", the strange-looking house of the zoo's founder, is still intact.
 "Münster Arkaden" (2006), new shopping centre between Prinzipalmarkt and the Pablo Picasso Museum of Graphic Art
 "Cavete", the oldest academic pub in Münster
 Westphalian State Museum of Art and Cultural History
 University Bible museum
 Buddenturm – a former city water tower built about 1150 as a defence tower and now fitted with windows, is near the largest aggregation of pubs in the city
 City Museum ("Stadtmuseum"), exhibition of a large collection showing the political and cultural history of the city from its beginning up to present, housed by a converted former department store
 University Mineralogical Museum
 Westphalian Horse Museum ("Hippomax")
 Mühlenhof open-air museum, depicting a typical Westphalian village as it looked centuries ago
 Westphalian Museum for Natural History, state museum and planetarium
 Museum of Lacquer Art (founded and operated by the company BASF Coatings)
 Pablo Picasso Museum of Graphic Art, the only museum devoted exclusively to the graphic works of Pablo Picasso
 Pinkus Müller, the only brewery left in Münster; originally there were more than 150.
 Kiepenkerl statue in Kiepenkerl Square

Education
Münster is home to many institutions of higher education, including the University of Münster and University of Applied Sciences. The city also has 92 primary and secondary education schools. The city had 61,441 students in 2015/16.

Transport

Air
Münster Osnabrück International Airport serves the city of Münster. The airport provides flights to European destinations mostly.

Bicycling
Münster claims to be the bicycle capital of Germany. It states that in 2007, vehicle traffic (36.4%) fell below traffic by bicycle (37.6%), even though it is unclear how such a figure is defined. The city maintains an extensive network for bicycles including the popular "Promenade" which encircles Münster's city centre. While motorised vehicles are banned, there are paths for pedestrians. Additional bicycle paths link all city districts with the inner city and special traffic lights provide signals for bicyclists. Bicycle stations in Münster offer bicycle rentals.

Train
Münster's Central Station is on the Wanne-Eickel–Hamburg railway. The city is connected by Intercity trains to many other major cities in Germany.

Public transportation
Historically, Münster had a historic tramway system, but it closed in 1954. Today, Münster does have some public transportation, which includes bus expresses, sightseeing buses, "waterbuses", Lime scooters and bicycle rentals. It is the largest German city without a U-Bahn or an S-Bahn system.

Sports
The city is home to Preußen Münster, which was founded on 30 April 1906. The main section is football, and the team plays at Preußenstadion. Other important sports teams include the USC Münster e.V. volleyball club.

British forces

After the Second World War, Münster became a major station within Osnabrück Garrison, part of British Forces Germany. Their presence was gradually reduced, yet there are still many active military bases. The last forces left Münster on 4 July 2013.

Twin towns – sister cities

Münster is twinned with:

 York, England, United Kingdom (1958)
 Orléans, France (1960)
 Kristiansand, Norway (1967)
 Monastir, Tunisia (1969)
 Rishon LeZion, Israel (1981)
 Fresno, United States (1986)
 Ryazan, Russia (1989)
 Mühlhausen, Germany (1990)
 Lublin, Poland (1991)
 Enschede, Netherlands (2020)

Notable people 

 Johannes Veghe (c. 1435–1504), religious writer
 Henry Nicholis (ca.1501 – ca.1580) a German mystic, founded Familia Caritatis.
 Christoph Bernhard Verspoell (1743–1818), priest and publisher of an influential hymnal
 Clemens August Droste zu Vischering (1773–1845) Archbishop of Cologne.
 Georges Depping (1784–1853), German-French historian
 Annette von Droste-Hülshoff (1797–1848), noble and poet.
 Wilhelm Emmanuel von Ketteler (1811–1877), theologian and politician, Bishop of Mainz.
 Paul Melchers (1813–1895), Cardinal and Archbishop of Cologne
 Joseph Weydemeyer (1818–1866), military officer, journalist, politician and Marxist revolutionary
 Ludwig von Wittich (1818–1884), Prussian lieutenant general
 Max von Forckenbeck (1821–1892), National Liberal politician, mayor of Wroclaw and Berlin
 Bernard Altum (1824–1900), zoologist, ornithologist and forest scientist
 Elisabet Ney (1833–1907), sculptor
 Alexander von Kluck (1846–1934), German general, World War I
 Albert Kopfermann (1846–1914), musicologist and librarian
 Mary of the Divine Heart Droste zu Vischering (1863–1899), noble and nun beatified by Pope Paul VI
 Carl Schuhmann (1869–1946), gymnast and wrestler
 Alfred Flechtheim (1878–1937), art dealer, art collector, journalist and publisher
 Clemens August Graf von Galen (1878–1946), cardinal, Bishop of Münster, beatified by Pope Benedict XVI
 Friedrich-Carl Rabe von Pappenheim (1894–1977), general in the Wehrmacht of Nazi Germany and war criminal
 Kurt Gerstein (1905–1945), SS officer
 Gunther Plaut (1912–2012), Reform rabbi and author
 Moondog (1916–1999), musician, composer, theoretician, poet and inventor of musical instruments
 Stefan Dohr (born 1965), French horn player, current principal horn of the Berlin Philharmonic
 Alfred Dregger (1920–2002), politician and leader of the CDU
 Peter Duesberg (born 1936) virologist who discovered the first retrovirus
 Dieter Sieger (born 1938), shipbuilder
 Heinz Lukas-Kindermann (born 1939), opera director
 Detlev Jöcker (born 1951), composer, singer and songwriter
 Götz Alsmann (born 1957), television presenter, musician and singer
 Andreas Dombret (born 1960), board member of German central bank Deutsche Bundesbank
 Monika Grütters (born 1962), politician
 Ute Lemper (born 1963), cabaret singer and actress
 Tanita Tikaram (born 1969), British singer-songwriter
 Berthold Warnecke (born 1971), dramaturge and opera director
 Franka Potente (born 1974), German actress
 Linus Gerdemann (born 1982), cyclist
 Esther Dierkes (born 1990), opera singer

Gallery

See also

Munster, Lower Saxony
Munster Province, Republic of Ireland
CeNTech
Fernmeldeturm
Muenster, Texas, U.S.
H-Blockx
Minster, Ohio, U.S.

References

External links

 
English page of Münster All-Weather Zoo 
Münster Zoo at Zoo-Infos.de 
Muenster City Panoramas – Panoramic Views of Münster's Highlights 
7Grad.org – Bunkers in Muenster – History of Muenster's air raid shelters 
The Siege of Muenster – audio discussion from "In Our Time" BBC
Technology Park Münster (Host of technology companies in Münster) 
Tourist-Info  
Münster Events 
Münster Notgeld (emergency banknotes) depicting the Münster Rebellion with Ian Bockelson, Berndt Knipperdollink, Berntken Krechting, and Jan van Leyden. http://webgerman.com/Notgeld/Directory/M/Muenster.htm

 
Oil campaign of World War II
Members of the Hanseatic League
Populated places established in the 8th century
8th-century establishments in Europe